Moshe Bar (born in Jerusalem in June 1971) is an Israeli author, investor and entrepreneur.

Biography
He is currently CEO of Codenotary Inc., a provider of solutions to record business data immutably, using and initiator of the open source project immudb.io. He was previously a general partner of Texas Atlantic Capital LP, a venture capital company. Prior to that, he was a co-founder of Qumranet. Qumranet was sold to Red Hat in 2008 for US$107 million.

He previously founded the company behind the Xen software, XenSource, which was sold to Citrix for US$500 million in 2007. Before that he founded  Qlusters Inc, and was the founder, main developer and project manager of openMosix. Furthermore, he frequently acts as an angel investor in high-tech start-up companies such as Hyper9, Neebula, Delivery Hero SE, and Qlayer, which was sold to Sun Microsystems in January 2009.

The author of several books on Linux, file systems and open source development, he was also a senior editor at Byte Magazine for over eight years. He also taught at Tel Aviv University.

Before entering the high-tech business, he was a career officer in the Israel Defense Forces.

References 

1971 births
Israeli chief executives
Israeli company founders
Israeli computer programmers
Linux kernel programmers
Israeli Jews
Free software programmers
Jewish Israeli writers
Living people
People from Jerusalem
Academic staff of Tel Aviv University
Technology company founders